Rajasthan Police Academy (RPA), Devanāgarī: (राजस्थान पुलिस अकादमी) is the premier institute for training of Rajasthan Police Service (RPS) officers and other Subordinate Police officers before they are sent to their respective districts to carry out their duty. The Academy is in Jaipur, Rajasthan, India.

Rajasthan Police Academy is one of the top six police training institutions in the country  as adjudged by Bureau of Police Research and Development, Ministry of Home Affairs, Govt. of India.

Introduction
The first Police training institute of Rajasthan was established at the base of historic fort of Chittorgarh in the year 1950.  It was shifted to Kishangarh and then to its present location i.e. Jaipur in the year 1975 and was upgraded as Rajasthan Police Academy. From the outset, the Academy's endeavour was to evolve as the best police training institution and accordingly it is shaping as a model Training Academy to train the police personnel and other stakeholders of the society.

The Academy is providing basic training to all the ranks from Constable to Deputy Superintendent of Police. The IPS officers, after completion of their training at NPA also undergo training at the Academy for three weeks on local laws and other related subjects. The Academy is engaged in organising Special Courses for the police personnel from Constable to ADGP level from Rajasthan and other States of the country. The Academy has also provided training to 300 Sri Lankan Police officers of Presidential Security Division and Constables of Chandigarh Police and is presently providing Band Training to the Band Constables of CISF.  The Academy has conducted many Vertical Interaction Courses for IPS officers and was a venue for ATA courses for IPS officers conducted by the Department of State of the United States on varied topics.

The Academy is going ahead with a vision to be a premier Police Training Institution with motivated faculty and all modern training facilities. The faculty is chosen after their willingness and having gone through an interview by the expert panel to check their efficiency, effectiveness and motivation level.  They are prepared to take on challenges of multifarious duties and to educate and impart social, moral and ethical values to the trainees besides the topics of policing. Its endeavour is also to adapt to the democratic tenets and make our trainees positive and sensitive with humanitarian attitude and to be alive to the expectations of the citizenry. The Academy aims to make the trainees expert in dealing with difficult situations and equip them with scientific prowess in investigation of the cases. The Training of Trainers (TOT) is also organized to provide them knowledge of their subjects with innovative skills in their profession. The Academy has developed Standard Operating Procedures (SOPs) for all the branches for a systematic and smooth functioning.

Organisation
The Academy is headed by an Additional Director General of Police rank officer as Director who is assisted by a Deputy Director of Superintendent of Police rank, five Assistant Directors of the rank of Additional Superintendent of Police and other subordinate ranks.
Shri saurabh srivastav, IPS is the present Director of the Academy.

Training
The number of trainings provided in Rajasthan Police Academy is one of the highest in the country but the Academy does not focus on numbers only. Its endeavour is on the quality of training. The Academy has a pool of prominent faculty members on different topics and the onus of quality is on the faculty itself. The criteria for continuance of faculty include the feedback of participants. The number of personnel trained in the Academy in last 5 years are given below:- 

The role of faculty is not only confined to taking classes but they also to engage themselves in preparing training material. The Academy has prepared Sub Inspector Basic Course study material, Constable Recruits Guide in three volumes, Investigation Guide, Police Investigation, SOP on Police Constable Practical Work, Human Trafficking, POCSO provisions and Role of Police, Juvenile Justice System and Role of Police, Mahila and Bal Desk-Role and Responsibilities of Police, Check List of Investigation of Various Heinous Offences, Information Booklet on RTI etc.
The CHRI and the Academy have jointly developed "Virtual Police Station" Project which is a vital training tool to be used by the Police and Public. We are planning to venture for Virtual Class Room to be used by the other training Centers.

Infrastructure and facilities
The Academy has an enviable infrastructure to emulate and even outflank any best police training institution in the country. The prominent facilities are the main parade ground with red sand and the subsidiary parade ground, the air conditioned auditorium with a capacity of 450 persons, the swimming pool with the size of 25 X 13 meter, Multipurpose Hall with a capacity of 500 persons, a Gymnasium with all kind of modern equipments, well maintained Open Air Theatre with a capacity of 900 persons, the indoor firing range with simulator, the Kalpataru nursery etc. The Equestrian School and the Band School are fully functional in the Academy. The Academy has one Guest house, two hostels for the gazetted officers and 9 other hostels for subordinate ranks.

The Academy has a class room capacity of 1235 with five air conditioned conference halls of 295 capacities and a lecture theatre of a capacity of 140 persons. There are 16 class rooms in the Academy and each class can easily accommodate 50 trainees. The class rooms are equipped with LED Projector, CPU, sound systems, black/white boards with internet facility. The Academy has three cyber-labs with 110 computers and other accessories for training purpose. The Academy has investigation kits, drug detection kits, mock crime scenes and a mini lab for the training purpose. The faculty is well versed in using these facilities and mostly using power point presentation to deliver lectures in the class. 
The Academy has a well-stocked library having more than 35,000 books and is subscribing to all major journals and important magazines.

The wet canteen is stocked with all necessary items and the CPC canteen has stock of all the items generally available in CSD canteens and the items are provided on C.S.D. rates to the members. The Cafeteria with quality furniture is situated near indoor staff room to be used by trainees and staff.  The Academy has a Hospital of its own in the campus. The Shaheed Smarak (Martyrs Memorial) has been developed as a major attraction for the visitors to the Academy to pay their homage to Police Martyrs.

Commitment to social cause
The Academy has been committed to social issues and was instrumental in providing training to 3960 Student Police Cadets and their PSLO's, CPO's, ACPO's and Drill Instructors in Basic Police Duties. The safety of the girls was another concern and 359 Women Master Trainers were trained to further train the girls in schools and colleges on self-defence and so far 1,51,727 girls have been trained. The physical instructors of the Academy have also visited different schools and colleges in Jaipur to provide training on self-defense to the girls.

The Academy has selected Tonk district in Rajasthan as a model district of 'Child Friendly Policing' in collaboration with UNICEF. The sincere endeavour of the committed faculty has resulted into training to 1295 police officers and members of CWC, JJB, NGO's and CLG's in 'Child Friendly Policing'. The Academy has organized workshops on Child Protection issues in Ajmer, Bikaner, Udaipur and Bharatpur Ranges in collaboration with UNICEF and topics such as Child Rights, POCSO, JJ Act, Child marriage, Child labour etc. and national/ international treaties and standards have been deliberated upon at length.
 
The Academy takes care of its women employees and the Mahila Kalyan Kendra is giving vocational training to the women and girls in the campus. The skills of the women members is tested through different competitions organized by the executive of the Kendra. The children are being taken care of by the Crèche in the Academy and working mothers can go to duties without any worry for their children.

Prominent events

The Academy was chosen to be the host of 33rd National Symposium of Heads of Training Institutions  in 2014 where all the training heads deliberated on improving the quality of police training. The Union Home Minister Shri Rajnath Singh graced the valedictory session.

The Academy was the host of All India Police Equestrian Meet in 2015 and also the host of All India Police Band Competition in 2016.

Recently in October 2016, the Academy's Central Police Band and other Artists presented a spectacular show in ‘South Asian Sufi Festival’ at Diggi Palace, Jaipur.

See also
 Bureau of Police Research and Development
 National Crime Records Bureau
 Law enforcement in India

References

External links
 Rajasthan Police Academy, Jaipur official website
 Bureau of Police Research and Development official website
 Rajasthan Police official website

Rajasthan Police
State agencies of Rajasthan
1951 establishments in Rajasthan
Government agencies established in 1951
Police academies in India